is a dark sub-kilometer asteroid on a highly eccentric orbit, classified as a near-Earth object and potentially hazardous asteroid of the Apollo group, approximately  in diameter.

This object was the first possible discovery of the reinstated NEOWISE program of the WISE telescope, following the program's hibernation in 2011.

Orbit and classification 

 belongs to the Apollo asteroids, which cross the orbit of Earth. They are the largest group of near-Earth objects with nearly 10 thousand known members.

This object orbits the Sun at a distance of 0.76–4.0 AU once every 3 years and 9 months (1,357 days; semi-major axis of 2.40 AU). Its orbit has an eccentricity of 0.68 and an inclination of 1° with respect to the ecliptic. Due to this close proximity, NASA has classified this object as a potential threat. At the time of the first WISE observations, this object was moving at a rate of 3.2° per day (for comparison the apparent diameter of the Moon is 0.5°).

Close approaches 

In August 2002 and December 2013, approached Earth at 4.1 LD and 94 LD, respectively. It also makes close approaches to Jupiter, Venus, Mars and the Moon.

First WISE observations 

The Wide-field Infrared Survey Explorer's Near-Earth Object WISE (NEOWISE) program was put into hibernation on 1 February 2011, following several program extensions, from which approximately 34,000 asteroids were detected. On 21 August 2013, however, the program was reactivated. The new mission of the NEOWISE was to identify the population of potentially hazardous near-Earth objects.

The infrared brightness was the primary attribute used for ascertaining the approximate size of the asteroid. Over the course of half a day, the trajectory of the asteroid was observed against the stationary positioning of the stars in the background.

The data from the Wide-field Infrared Survey Explorer was transmitted to the Infrared Processing and Analysis Center at the California Institute of Technology, located in Pasadena, California. To confirm the discovery, researchers at the University of Arizona utilized the Spacewatch telescope at the Kitt Peak National Observatory in Tucson, Arizona.  is considered by NASA to be the first in what is expected to be thousands of objects to be detected by NEOWISE's new mission. Due to the trajectory of the asteroid, which puts it within a potentially dangerous range in over one hundred years following its discovery, NASA stated that they would keep a watchful eye on it.

Physical characteristics 

According to the survey carried out by the NEOWISE mission of NASA's Wide-field Infrared Survey Explorer,  measures 0.402 kilometers in diameter and its surface has an exceptionally low albedo of 0.025. Estimates from 2014 gave a somewhat larger diameter of 0.650 kilometers (0.404 miles). Its very dark surface, has an albedo comparable to a piece of coal.

See also 
 List of asteroid close approaches to Earth in 2013

References

External links 
 List of the Potentially Hazardous Asteroids (PHAs), Minor Planet Center
 PHA Close Approaches To The Earth, Minor Planet Center
 
 
 

Minor planet object articles (unnumbered)

20131229